Three Brothers is part of the Private Snafu series of animated shorts produced by Warner Bros. during World War II. Screened for troops in September 1944, the cartoon was directed by Friz Freleng and features the familiar voice of Mel Blanc.

Plot
 
Private Snafu is seen performing the tedious task of sorting boots.  Driven to madness by boredom he is taken to visit his brothers Tarfu and Fubar by the gruff Technical Fairy, First Class, somewhat in the spirit of Ebenezer Scrooge and the Ghosts of Christmas. Brother Tarfu is seen tending to every need of carrier pigeons while brother Fubar is the unlucky dummy used in training attack dogs.  After seeing his brothers' terrible jobs Private Snafu returns to work with gusto, exclaiming that his job is important.

Cameos
In a scene where Fubar gets chased by attack dogs, Bugs Bunny makes an appearance inside his rabbit hole. Fubar places Bugs next to his hole and hides inside it. He does not speak in this short.

References
 Friedwald, Will and Jerry Beck. The Warner Brothers Cartoons. Scarecrow Press Inc., Metuchen, N.J., 1981. .

External links
 
 
 Watch Three Brothers on YouTube

1944 films
1944 animated films
1944 short films
1940s animated short films
Short films directed by Friz Freleng
Articles containing video clips
Private Snafu
Films scored by Carl Stalling
Bugs Bunny films
American black-and-white films
Films produced by Leon Schlesinger
1944 comedy films
1940s Warner Bros. animated short films